Mountain Meadow or Mountain Meadows, is an area in present-day Washington County, Utah. It was a place of rest and grazing used by pack trains and drovers, on the Old Spanish Trail and later Mormons, Forty-niners, mail riders, migrants and teamsters on the Mormon Road on their way overland between Utah and California.

History
In 1856, Mormon settlers established Hamblin east of the head of Holt Canyon, originally called Meadow Canyon. The children that survived the massacre were first taken in by families in Hamblin.

Overgrazing of the meadows subsequently led to their erosion, and consequent lowering of the water table, drying up many of its springs and degrading of the meadow grasslands. This in turn led to the abandonment of the settlement of Hamblin by 1905.

References

Old Spanish Trail (trade route)
Mormon Road
National Register of Historic Places in Washington County, Utah
Significant places in Mormonism
Mountain Meadows Massacre
National Historic Landmarks in Utah
Geography of Washington County, Utah
Meadows in the United States
Conflict sites on National Register of Historic Places in Utah